Piz Chalchagn (3,154 m) is a mountain in the Bernina Range of the Alps, located south of Pontresina in the canton of Graubünden. It lies at the northern end of the range north of La Spedla and culminating at Piz Bernina.

References

External links
 Piz Chalchagn on Hikr

Bernina Range
Mountains of Graubünden
Mountains of the Alps
Alpine three-thousanders
Mountains of Switzerland
Pontresina
Samedan